The Saskatchewan Teachers' Federation (STF) is a professional association and trade union representing over 13,500 schoolteachers in the Canadian province of Saskatchewan . The organization's headquarters is located in Saskatoon.

See also
 Canadian Teachers' Federation
 Education in Saskatchewan

References

External links
 

1933 establishments in Saskatchewan
Canadian Teachers' Federation
Education trade unions
Education-related professional associations
Educational organizations based in Canada
Educational organizations established in 1933
Organizations based in Saskatoon
Professional associations based in Saskatchewan
Trade unions established in 1933
Trade unions in Canada